Spongiosperma macrophyllum is a species of plant in the family Apocynaceae first described in 1860. It is native to the Amazon Basin of South America, nations of Venezuela, Colombia, and Brazil .

References

macrophyllum
Flora of the Amazon
Plants described in 1860